The TCDD E8000 is a three-car electric multiple unit operated by the Turkish State Railways (TCDD) on the Istanbul suburban service. They were some of the first electric trains using the newly developed 25 kV 50 Hz AC power system.

Technical specifications

History
A total of 28 TCDD E8000s were built by French manufacturers Alstom, Jeumont and De Dietrich Ferroviaire, with deliveries beginning in 1955. They were used on the newly electrified European commuter train service in Istanbul. After the Asian side electrification, the trains also served there. They were lengthened to four cars with locally manufactured intermediate cars, which were later withdrawn.

The original livery was dark-red and white. On 1 September 2010 the arrival of new trains was cut in 2011 after waiting for 6 months.

References

External links

 Trains of Turkey E8000 listing

E 8000
Alstom multiple units
Train-related introductions in 1955
1955 in rail transport
50 c/s Group locomotives
25 kV AC multiple units